Oxalis grandis, commonly known as great yellow woodsorrel or large yellow wood sorrel, is an annual plant and herb in the woodsorrel family. It is native to the eastern United States from Georgia north to Pennsylvania and Wisconsin, west as far as Louisiana. It blooms from May to June with yellow flowers and grows in sandy woods or alluvial soils.

References

grandis
Flora of the Eastern United States
Plants described in 1888